Friedrich Ladegast (August 30, 1818 – June 30, 1905) was a famous German organ builder.

Ladegast was born in Hochhermsdorf (now Hermsdorf), Saxony, to a carpenter and cabinet-maker. He worked first for his brother Christlieb, an organ builder at Geringswalde, and built his first two organs at the age of twenty. He then traveled as a journeyman to various workshops, including those of Johann Gottlob Mende in Leipzig, Urban Kreutzbach in Borna, Adolf Zuberbier in Dessau, Martin Wetzel in Strasbourg, and Aristide Cavaillé-Coll in Paris. His work with Cavaillé-Coll was especially influential on his own designs; the two developed a friendship, and Ladegast introduced many technical innovations learned from Cavaillé-Coll's workshop to Germany, such as swell pedals and Barker levers.

He set up his own workshop at Weißenfels in 1846, with his first commission being for a small organ in Geusa. He went on to build over 200 organs, with notable works including the reconstruction of the organ of the Merseburg Cathedral (IV/81, 1855), and building the organ of the Nikolaikirche in Leipzig (IV/84,1859–62). His largest instrument was for Schwerin Cathedral (IV/84, 1870–71).  His son, Oskar Ladegast, took over his firm in 1898.

References
 
 

1818 births
1905 deaths
People from Mittelsachsen
German pipe organ builders
Musical instrument manufacturing companies of Germany